WKRE (88.1 FM, "Revocation Radio") is an American non-commercial educational radio station licensed to serve the community of Argo, Alabama. The station, established in 2011, is owned and operated by TBTA Ministries.

Programming
WKRE broadcasts a religious radio format of Christian rock and hip-hop music branded as "Revocation Radio" to northern Birmingham, Alabama, and surrounding suburbs.

History
In October 2007, Wilbur Gospel Communications and Foundation of Opelika, Alabama, applied to the Federal Communications Commission (FCC) for a construction permit for a new broadcast radio station. The FCC granted this permit on December 12, 2008, with a scheduled expiration date of December 12, 2011. The new station was assigned call sign "WKRE" on August 7, 2009.

On October 21, 2009, Wilbur Gospel Communications and Foundation contracted to sell the WKRE permit (plus the permit for WJAU in Lincoln, Alabama) to Jimmy Jarrell's Alabama Christian Radio, Inc., for a combined sale price of $1. The FCC gave the sale conditional approval on December 9, 2009, and the deal was consummated on December 15, 2009.

On March 19, 2010, Alabama Christian Radio, Inc., reached a deal to sell WKRE's construction permit to Ken Layton's TBTA Ministries for $1. The FCC approved this sale (with conditions) on May 7, 2010, and consummation of the transaction took place on May 20, 2010.

After construction and testing were completed in February 2011, WKRE was granted its broadcast license on March 18, 2011.

On air talent features Birmingham radio legend Jon Walden and Anthony Baumann on The Morning Overload from 7 a.m. until 10a.m.

In March 2015, this station received a construction permit for a new antenna location in Argo.  The new antenna is higher, so power is lower, but more coverage falls over the far eastern Birmingham suburbs than before.  That permit was dismissed in July 2016, but another nearly identical one was filed right behind it, further raising antenna height but lowering the power level.  That facility was put on the air in March 2017. (Taken from Alabama Broadcast Media Page)

References

External links

Radio stations established in 2011
Jefferson County, Alabama
KRE
2011 establishments in Alabama